The ruins of a Medieval chapel of St Thomas Becket are located in the grounds of St Petroc's Church, Bodmin. It is now roofless and in a ruinous state. It is protected as a Scheduled Ancient Monument and grade II listed building. 

A single story building, it was built in the 14th century and licensed in 1377. There is a crypt below the chapel and it is considered that "...the decorated window tracery is of particular interest and rarity for Cornwall".

References

Roman Catholic churches in Cornwall
Monuments and memorials in Cornwall
Churches in Bodmin